The Wisconsin Department of Administration (DOA) is an agency of the Wisconsin state government which provides a range of services and programs, from operations, technology, and logistical support for the state, to assistance programs for low-income homes, to state gaming.  The department's services to other state agencies and offices include personnel management, payroll, accounting systems, technology solutions, and legal services.  The Department is central to the state budget process, advising the Governor and state agencies on their budget submissions and analyzing solutions to fiscal problems.  The Department also administers state information systems, procurement policies and contracts, fleet transportation, and risk management, and oversees buildings owned and leased by the state, facilities planning projects, and the Wisconsin Capitol Police. 

The Department is headquartered in the Wisconsin Administration Building in Madison, Wisconsin. Kathy Koltin Blumenfeld is the current Secretary of the Department of Administration, appointed by Governor Tony Evers on January 18, 2022.

Organization

Leadership
The senior leadership of the Department consists of the Secretary, Deputy Secretary, and Assistant Deputy Secretary, along with the administrators heading up the divisions of the Department.
 Secretary: Kathy Koltin Blumenfeld
 Deputy Secretary: Chris Patton
 Assistant Deputy Secretary: Danielle Williams
 Enterprise Operations: Jana Steinmetz
 Enterprise Technology: Trina Zanow
 Executive Budget & Finance: Brian D. Pahnke
 Facilities Development & Management: Naomi De Mers
 Gaming: John Dillett
 Hearings & Appeals: Brian Hayes
 Intergovernmental Relations: Dawn Vick
 Legal Services: Anne Hanson
 Personnel Management: Jen Flogel
 Chief, Wisconsin State Capitol Police: David M. Erwin

Divisions

Energy, Housing and Community Resources
The Division of Energy, Housing and Community Resources (DEHCR) develops state housing policy and offers program assistance and funds to address homelessness and support affordable housing, public infrastructure, and economic development opportunities.  The Division also administers the state program providing electric and heating payment assistance to eligible households, as well as benefits to assist with energy crisis situations and weatherization services.

Enterprise Operations

The Division of Enterprise Operations (DEO) administers enterprise policies governing procurement, risk management, fleet management, and records management, and provides services to the Department of Administration and other state agencies in financial management, procurement, fleet management, air transportation, records management, mail transportation, risk management.  In addition, through the State Prosecutors Office, the division provides support to county district attorneys on budgeting, legislative research, grant support, and employment services.  The division also facilitates opportunities for disadvantaged businesses to sell goods and services to state agencies.

Subdivisions include:
 State Bureau of Procurement
 Bureau of Enterprise Fleet 
 Bureau of State Risk Management
 Bureau of Financial Management
 Supplier Diversity Program
 State Prosecutors Office (SPO)
 Continuity of Operations / Continuity of Government (COOP/COG)
 Serve Wisconsin
 Volkswagen Mitigation Program

Enterprise Technology
The Division of Enterprise Technology (DET) provides services, training, and knowledge to assist state agencies in utilizing technology to achieve their business objectives.  In addition, every two years the Division publishes a strategic IT plan for the state outlining new technology goals for the state government.  

Subdivisions include:
 Application Services
 Bureau of Technical Architecture & Project Management
 Bureau of Policy and Budget
 Bureau of Infrastructure Support
 Bureau of Security
 Bureau of Publishing & Distribution
 Bureau of District Attorney IT

Executive Budget & Finance
The Division of Executive Budget and Finance provides accounting, budget, and financial services for the state government.  The Division also provides fiscal and policy analysis to the Governor for development of executive budget proposals, and assists agencies in the technical preparation of budget requests.  It also reviews new legislation and prepares or coordinates the fiscal estimates that accompany all expenditure bills.

Subdivisions include:
 State Budget Office
 State Capital Finance Office
 State Controller's Office

Facilities Development & Management 
The Division of Facilities Development & Management (DFDM) is responsible for producing and implementing the biennial State Building Program, which facilitates all construction, remodeling, renovation, and maintenance of facilities owned by the state government or the University of Wisconsin System.  The Division is also responsible for building management, maintenance, and tenant services for the State Capitol, the Executive Residence, and 28 other State office buildings.

Gaming
The Division of Gaming is charged with protecting the integrity of Indian and charitable gaming in Wisconsin.  They handle licensing, background investigations, and regulatory enforcement activities to ensure compliance with state laws and regulations.

Hearings & Appeals
The Division of Hears & Appeals (DHA) is a quasi-judicial independent entity attached to the Department of Administration for administrative purposes.  The Division provides administrative hearings where administrative law judges, who do not work for the regulated agency, are able to provide a fair and impartial rulings on the administrative process.  

Subdivisions include:
 Corrections Unit
 Office of Worker's Compensation Hearings
 General Government Unit
 Waste Facility Siting Board
 Work & Family Services Unit

Intergovernmental Relations
The Division of Intergovernmental Relations (DIR) supports Wisconsin's counties, municipalities, residents, and businesses with services in land use planning, land information and records modernization, municipal boundary review, plat review, demography, and coastal management programs.

Continuous Improvement
The Division of Continuous Improvement works to design and implement systems change within the state government to improve efficiency, solve problems, and encourage innovation.

Legal Services
The Division of Legal Services provides legal assistance to the Secretary, department managers, and staff.  They provide guidance on procurement, contracting, administrative rule drafting and interpretation, construction, budget development, public records law, and other activities.  The Division also serves as a resource to other state agencies on these topics, with a goal to bring greater consistency to these common activities.

Personnel Management
The Division of Personnel Management (DPM) provides support to state agencies on human resources management.  The Division oversees the state civil service system, manages labor relations, develops and maintains the state classification and compensation systems, and leads the state's affirmative action and equal opportunity employment programs.  

Subdivisions include:
 Bureau of Equity & Inclusion
 Bureau of Classification & Compensation
 Bureau of Employee Management
 Bureau of Merit Recruitment & Selection

Wisconsin State Capitol Police

The Capitol Police have statewide jurisdiction to enforce all civil and criminal laws.  They are tasked with the safety of all state employees and the security of all facilities owned or leased by the state.  They provide the personal security for the Governor, the Governor's family, the Lieutenant Governor, and other high ranking state officials and dignitaries.

Subdivision include:
 Patrol Operations Section
 Support Services Section
 Criminal Investigations Unit
 Dignitary Protection Unit
 K-9 Unit
 Unmanned Aircraft Unit

Secretaries and commissioners

Commissioners (1959–1968)

Secretaries (1968–present)

References

External links 
 Department of Administration
 Serve Wisconsin
 State of Wisconsin Strategic IT Plan, 2018

Administration
1959 establishments in Wisconsin
Housing in Wisconsin